Luis Espinal may refer to:

 Luís Espinal Camps (1932–1980), Spanish Jesuit priest, poet, journalist and filmmaker
 Luis Espinal (footballer) (born 1994), Dominican footballer